Eight Sleep is an American technology company based in New York City that specializes in developing and manufacturing of smart mattresses.

History
Eight Sleep was founded in 2014 by CEO Matteo Franceschetti, Massimo Andreasi Bassi, Andrea Ballarini, and Alexandra Zatarain. The company financed their first projects through a crowdfunding campaign in 2015. From 2016 onward, the company raised money through more traditional means, participating in a Series B fundraising round in 2018 and a Series C fundraising round in 2021.

Products
Eight Sleep sells smart mattresses that allow users to track data regarding their sleep cycles, control the temperature of their beds, and set wake-up alarms that are integrated within the mattress. The company has also integrated its offerings with Amazon's Echo devices.

The company's products have been well-received by technology reviewers. Newsweek called the company's Mattress Pod Pro system, the "mattress of the future" and praised the product's temperature control system as a major selling point. Likewise, New York Magazine described the company's smart mattresses as the only ones on the market able to reliably provide temperature control. However, a reviewer at Forbes who tried the bed found himself "a little anxious" due to the product's tendency to penalize his "sleep score" if he did not go to bed on time.

References

Mattress retailers of the United States
Manufacturing companies established in 2014
Retail companies established in 2014
Companies based in New York City